The San Clemente loggerhead shrike (Lanius ludovicianus mearnsi) or San Clemente Island loggerhead shrike is a subspecies of the loggerhead shrike that is endemic to San Clemente Island, California.

Description
The San Clemente loggerhead shrike is a passerine bird of medium size. Around its eyes, it has black feathers, a color which is also found in the tail and on the wings. On its back, it has gray feathers. The underside of the bird is white. It also has patches of white on its wings and tail.

Habitat
The San Clemente loggerhead shrike is native to San Clemente Island, a small island off the coast of California, United States. The island is owned by the United States Navy, and is a valuable asset to the Pacific fleet, allowing for ship-to-shore, air-to-ground, and ground-to-ground operational training. Shrikes typically occupy wooded canyons on the west side of the island, and sagebrush-dominant habitat on the eastern escarpment.

Environmental status
Since the 1880s, the San Clemente loggerhead shrike's habitat has been threatened by domestic animals, primarily goats, imported to San Clemente Island. By the early 1900s, the bird's population had declined to about 20, but stabilized. The Navy began removing introduced species in 1973. In 1977, the San Clemente loggerhead shrike was listed as endangered by the United States government, with an estimated population of 50. Between 1982 and 1999, the bird's population was measured between 14 and 33 birds, bottoming out in January 1998. The removal of feral goats and sheep was completed in 1993.

In 1996, the Institute for Wildlife Studies conducted video research on the shrike for the Navy. In 1997, they were asked to come up with a strategy to raise the bird's numbers. A captive breeding program was launched in 1992 at a cost of $3 million per year, and new policies were instituted to help the shrike. For example, snipers must aim around bird nests when practicing. Thanks to the program, the bird's population reached 135 (captive and wild) specimens by 2004. In 2009, an estimated 82 pairs were alive; this number decreased to 41 until 2017 due to drought in Southern California.

References

San Clemente loggerhead shrike
Endemic fauna of California
Endemic birds of the Western United States
Fauna of the Channel Islands of California
Fauna of the California chaparral and woodlands
Natural history of Los Angeles County, California
Endangered fauna of California
Native birds of the Western United States